The Cranleigh line was a railway line in England that connected Guildford in Surrey, with Horsham in West Sussex. Construction of the line was started by an independent company, the Horsham and Guildford Direct Railway, but management failures delayed construction, and the company was taken over by the London, Brighton and South Coast Railway (LBSCR). The LBSCR completed the construction of the line and it was opened in 1865; it was nearly 16 miles in length.

At Guildford the trains relied on using the station and approach route of the London and South Western Railway (LSWR). There was competitive tension between the LSWR and the LBSCR, and at the time Guildford station was already congested, so that access negotiations were not easy. The hopes of the original promoters that the line would become a trunk route for traffic from the Midlands to the Sussex Coast were not fulfilled, and low usage due to the agricultural nature of the terrain the line served resulted in continuous financial losses.

When British Railways considered the future of loss-making services in the mid-1960s, the line came under scrutiny, and it was closed on 14 June 1965.

History

Before the Horsham and Guildford Direct Railway

The London and Brighton Railway opened its main line between those places in 1841, and had already opened a branch line, more simply constructed, to Shoreham in 1840. The London and Brighton Railway merged with other companies to form the London, Brighton and South Coast Railway (LBSCR) in 1846.

In 1848 the LBSCR built a branch line from Three Bridges, on the Brighton main line, to Horsham, then an insignificant town. There the railway remained for some years, during which Horsham grew in importance. The next development was the construction of the Mid-Sussex Railway, opened in 1859. At first the Mid-Sussex Railway was to link Horsham and Petworth, but it later became part of a main line connection between London and the South Coast.

In 1861 a line from Horsham to Shoreham was opened, known as the Steyning Line. This gave a link to Brighton, leaving the Mid-Sussex line at Itchingfield Junction, three miles south of Horsham.

Meanwhile, Guildford, as the county town of Surrey was already of considerable importance. The London and Southampton Railway opened its main line throughout in 1840 and had changed its name to the London and South Western Railway in 1839. It passed Guildford several miles away, to the north, with a station at Woking (at the time named Woking Common). A branch line to Guildford was opened in 1845, and this was extended to a Godalming station by a nominally independent company, opening in 1849. In addition, the LSWR opened a Farnham branch line from Guildford via Tongham to Farnham, also in 1849.

Another railway route opened in 1849, the Reading, Guildford and Reigate Railway. In the Guildford area it relied on running powers over the LSWR lines, from Shalford Junction south of Guildford, through Guildford station, and then as far as Ash Junction on the Farnham line. These running powers had been authorised by Parliament. The Reading Guildford and Reigate Railway was an affiliate of the South Eastern Railway (SER), whose main focus was from London into Kent and East Sussex. However the connection it now had to Reading gave the possibility of an alliance with the Great Western Railway, which ran through Reading on its main line between London and Bristol, with connecting lines to South Wales and (under construction) to the West Midlands.

In the early decades of the nineteenth century, access to tidal water was a significant benefit to a population centre, enabling heavy materials to be brought in and taken away by coastal shipping. In the case of Guildford this had been achieved since 1816 by the Wey and Arun Canal. The canal proprietors saw that they were losing business to the railways and they decided that conversion of part of their canal to a railway would be worthwhile. The sixteen miles between Guildford and Pulborough could be converted for about £8,000 a mile, and would give access to the navigable section of the River Arun, and to the English Channel at Littlehampton. They met with the directors of the LBSCR in August 1859, evidently hoping for financial collaboration, but the LBSCR invited them to develop their idea into a more definite proposal. They failed to do so.

Guildford and Horsham Direct Railway promoted

Another scheme of a railway between Guildford and Horsham was being formulated at the same time, and a Bill was submitted to Parliament in the 1860 session, for a Horsham and Guildford Direct Railway (H&DGR). As the proposal presumed a connection with the LBSCR at Horsham, and no negotiation had taken place on the matter, the LBSCR opposed the Bill at first, to protect its interests. An approach from the promoters of the new railway, asking whether the LBSCR would work the line when built, met with approval and an agreement was concluded on 21 June 1860. The Horsham and Guildford Direct Railway Act gained the Royal Assent on 6 August 1860. Powers were given to make working arrangements with the LBSCR and the nominally independent Mid-Sussex Railway, with which the new line would make a junction. The LBSCR was allowed to contribute £75,000 to the capital of the new company.

The line would also make a junction with the LSWR south of Guildford and the Act authorised running powers on the LSWR. This was not specified in much detail, and the company had to negotiate with the LSWR. Initially the LSWR rebuffed the approach, stating that it would want the LBSCR to be a party to any talks, as there was a territorial exclusivity agreement in force between the two larger companies. Dating from 1860, the LSWR and the LBSCR had agreed not to develop or encourage new lines into areas considered to be the territory of each other. The Horsham and Guildford line would cross the agreed boundary.

Unsatisfactory talks dragged on, and the Horsham and Guildford company's directors showed themselves to be ineffective in finalising matters. At a board meeting on 8 March 1862 several H&GDR directors resigned; some other proposed board members turned out to be disqualified, having inadequate share holdings; and LBSCR nominees were elected, effectively taking over the company.

Construction

The prevarication over working arrangements had led to inaction over actual construction; there was a time limit in the authorising Act of four years, expiring in August 1864, so construction became urgent. The construction contract was made on 16 April 1862. In reviewing the plans for the work, the HGDR Board -- now effectively the LBSCR -- expressed dissatisfaction with the route. Hood states that

the directors noted that the new plans showed considerable alteration to the parliamentary line in some places" and Mr Jacomb-Hood, the LBSCR engineer, was informed that the alterations were unsatisfactory to the Board. They also required a junction towards Horsham at Stammerham. It appears that despite their railway's title, Mr Jacombe-Hood had omitted a junction to link the railway with Horsham. Apparently only the southward spur directly to the Shoreham line was included. He explained to the Board on 28 March 1862 that he entirely forgot that he had been informed of the line's route by Mr Woods, the H&GDR company engineer. The LBSCR endorsed changes to the route on 1 April 1862 and Woods was dismissed.

There was continuing concern over the slow progress of construction, and on 11 May 1863 it was reported that the land for six miles of the route between Cranleigh and Guildford had not yet been purchased.

On 29 July 1862 the two companies had formally agreed that the LBSCR would absorb the H&GDR company. The uncompleted railway was sold to the LBSCR for £123,000. This was authorised by the LBSCR Additional Powers Act of 29 July 1864.

On 2 May 1865 Frederick Bannister, now the engineer to the line, reported that the line would be ready for opening on 1 June 1865. The Board of Trade Inspecting Officer, Colonel Yolland visited, probably in May 1865, and refused consent to open. Subsequent visits in July and August 1865 had the same outcome. The principal difficulty was the working arrangement at Guildford, and after prolonged negotiations, Yolland was satisfied, and the line opened for traffic on 2 October 1865.

The line was single throughout, worked on the staff and ticket system. Baynards was the only crossing point at first, although passing loops were provided later at Bramley in 1876 and Cranleigh in 1880. The line was 15 miles 48 chains in length.

On 24 October 1865 the directors agreed on a LSWR proposal to enlarge part of Guildford station. Although Yolland had sanctioned the opening of the line, he had refused the opening of Rudgwick station intermediately, because it was on a 1 in 80 gradient; he required the gradient to be eased to no steeper than 1 in 130 for safety reasons; this was done, not without some difficulty, and Rudgwick station opened in November 1864.

Disappointing traffic
The southwards connecting spur at Stammerham (known as Itchingfield South Fork) was intended to allow trains to run between Guildford and Shoreham directly, but in fact very little such traffic presented itself, and the LBSCR closed the section on 1 August 1867.

In fact the entire railway business was disappointing, and major through flows from the Midlands to the South Coast did not develop. The activity of the railway settled into ordinary rural transport requirements, coal and cattle feed inward, and agricultural produce and some limited local mineral production out. As Hood says, "The coming of the railway to these districts … did not make any great difference to the development of a profitable railway system... or to the general economy of the area."

Christ's Hospital

In 1902 Christ's Hospital school moved to premises near Stammerham Junction. This together with an expectation that Horsham would expand westwards towards the Junction led the LBSCR to invest £30,000 in building a new station, that was to become Christ's Hospital station. The substantial red brick station reflecting the LBSCR's aspirations for the area was constructed using bricks supplied by the nearby Southwater Brickworks. The station premises were built in very considerable proportions and a local newspaper observed that "Some surprise at the size of the station is however natural considering the part that it will ostensibly serve." Five through tracks were laid which served seven facing platforms. Three platforms were set aside to the Cranleigh line and two other platforms served passengers on the main line. The expansion of residential Horsham into the area did not take place.

Rolling stock modernisation
The 1955 Modernisation Plan of British Railways led to the introduction of more modern locomotives: chiefly Ivatt Class 2 2-6-2T locomotives built by British Railways after 1948. The coaching stock was also modernised.

Post-war decline 
Already in the 1930s there had been a decline in use of the line as passengers and traders turned to road transport. The decline was more pronounced still after World War II , and in 1963 the Beeching Report included the line in the list of routes expected to be closed. The line was said to be losing £46,000 annually. Although a public hearing for protests took place, the Minister of Transport gave assent to the closure proposal and the line closed on 14 June 1965.

Train services
At first the passenger services were four journeys each way daily. Although the trunk freight flows had not materialsied, through special passenger excursion trains to south coast resorts were run.

Writing in 1950 Vallance said that the service then was eight trains on weekdays, two in Sundays with an additional train between Guildford and Cranleigh for season ticket holders travelling daily to and from London. During the summer months the line also carried Sunday excursions to the Sussex coastal resorts; these trains had to reverse at Christs Hospital in each direction. In 1950 push and pull trains were the norm.

Filming
In February 1957 the BBC filmed significant sections of action at Cranleigh for a television series version of The Railway Children. Shorter snatches were filmed on the line for a number of other films, including The Black Sheep of Whitehall (Will Hay, 1942, Baynards Level Crossing), They Were Sisters (1945, location unknown), Room At The Top (1959, doubtful, see note), The Horse Masters (1961, Baynards), The Grass Is Greener (1960, location unknown), Rotten to the Core (1965, Baynards and Christs Hospital) and The House at the End of the World (1965, location unknown).

Locations
 Stammerham Junction; divergence from the Horsham to Arundel line;
 Christs Hospital West Horsham; opened 1 May 1902; renamed Christs Hospital 1968/72; still open; the apostrophe has appeared erratically; a platform was used unscheduled for picnic parties October 1897 to April 1902 as Stammerham Junction;
 Itchingfield South Junction; southern apex of triangle; 
 Itchingfield North Junction;
 Slinfold; opened 2 October 1865; closed 14 June 1965;
 Rudgwick; opened 1 November 1865; closed 14 June 1965;
 Baynards; opened 2 October 1865; closed 14 June 1965;
 Cranley; opened 2 October 1865; renamed Cranleigh 1867; closed 14 June 1965;
 Bramley; opened 2 October 1865; renamed Bramley & Wonersh 1 June 1888; closed 14 June 1965;
 Peasmarsh Junction; convergence with line from Petersfield to Guildford.

Notes

References

External links
 Cranleigh Railway Line: The Guildford and Horsham Direct Railway: 1865 to 1965
 Sussex Industrial Archaeology Society: Shoreham - Guildford
 Cranleigh railway station on Subterranea Britannica
 Bramley & Wonersh railway station on Subterranea Britannica
 Baynards railway station on Subterranea Britannica
 Rudgwick railway station on Subterranea Britannica
 Slinfold railway station on Subterranea Britannica
 Christ's Hospital railway station on Subterranea Britannica

Closed railway lines in South East England
Rail transport in Surrey
Rail transport in West Sussex
Railway lines opened in 1865